William Land may refer to:
 William Land (athlete), English track and field athlete
 William Jesse Goad Land, American botanist, inventor, and professor
 Bill Land, American Negro league outfielder

See also
 William E.M. Lands, American nutritional biochemist